Dusty the Klepto Kitty was a domestic Snowshoe cat who gained notoriety in early 2011 for his acts of "cat burglary". As of his February 2011 appearance on the Late Show with David Letterman, Dusty had stolen 16 car wash mitts, 7 sponges, 213 dish towels, 7 wash cloths, 5 towels, 18 shoes, 73 socks, 100 gloves, 1 pair of mittens, 3 aprons, 40 balls, 4 pairs of underwear, 1 dog collar, 6 rubber toys, 1 blanket, 3 leg warmers, 2 Frisbees, 1 golf club head cover, 1 safety mask, 2 mesh bags, 1 bag of water balloons, 1 pair of pajama pants, 8 bathing suits, and 8 miscellaneous objects.

He earned the nickname Klepto Kitty after bringing home more than 600 items from the gardens he prowled at night. His owners say his record theft is eleven items in one spree. He has been caught on camera carrying home a bra.

Early years 
Born on March 20, 2006, Dusty is a Snowshoe cat who lives in San Mateo, California.  He was adopted from the Peninsula Humane Society by Jean Chu and Jim Coleman.

His first two years of life were uneventful, but in 2008, his owners began to notice household objects that did not belong to them appearing in strange places, and they began to suspect that their cat was bringing them home, a suspicion that they were eventually able to confirm.

Notoriety 
Although his thievery began in 2008, Dusty didn't really receive notoriety outside of his neighborhood until the Animal Planet show Must Love Cats aired a profile of him in February 2011.  The "Must Love Cats" crew was able to set up a motion-triggered night vision camera and catch Dusty in the act of bringing home his spoils. The Animal Planet report led to a February 14, 2011, story by Vic Lee of KGO-TV of San Francisco, and Dusty's appearance on the Late Show with David Letterman on February 22, 2011.

Cultural relevance
Since his appearances on Letterman and other national news outlets, Dusty became a minor national and international celebrity.  He has appeared at many community events in the San Francisco Bay Area and has made appearances on many national and international news outlets.  He served as the Grand Marshal of the Redwood City Pet Parade in May 2011, and appeared at a fundraiser for the Peninsula Humane Society in June 2011.   

Because of the kitty-cam footage for the Animal Planet documentary, Dusty's behavior became a bonus feature in a three-minute short on the DVD release for the 2011 movie Puss in Boots.  It is entitled Klepto Kitty.

Because Dusty was an adoptee from the Peninsula Humane Society animal shelter, he made a celebrity appearance at their annual adopt-a-thon in June, 2011. Some of his unclaimed stolen items were displayed and sold.

To keep his fans up to date with his finds, his owners maintain his Facebook page and provide pictures of the items that Dusty brings home.

See also
 List of individual cats

References

 "RIP 07-15-2006 (adopted) — 03-14-2023". Facebook

Further reading
 Klepto Feline Gives New Meaning to 'Cat' Burglar. ABC News (San Francisco).
 "Klepto Cat" to Make Celebrity Appearance. ABC News (San Francisco).
 The Klepto Kitty | Must Love Cats

2006 animal births
Burglars
Individual cats in the United States
Internet memes about cats
Male mammals